Sika Wɔ Ntaban is the Ghanaian given name for a fabric print found in Ghana, Togo and Nigeria. This fabric is produced by Ghana Textiles Company(GTP) under VLISCO and Akosombo Industrial Company Limited formerly called Akosombo Textiles Limited(ATL).

Background 
The Ghanaian given name  translates into English as 'Money has wings' or 'Money can fly like a Bird'. This name is borrowed from a Ghanaian proverb which is explained as money is not permanent and can be lost if not handled properly. The fabric is known as Speed Bird in English.

Design 
The fabric's design components includes a colored motif with lines and a flying bird on a plain or colored background in an oval shape. The colored motif comes in a variety of colors such as blue, yellow and green whereas the colored background of the bird comes in a variety of red, white and yellow backgrounds.

Other names 
The fabric is known by other names in other African countries. It is known by the name Air Afrique in Togo because it is used as the official uniform of a local airline company. In Nigeria it is known by the Igbo name Eneke which means that if hunters have mastered the art of shooting accurately then bird will master the art of flying without perching.

Fabric Usage 
This fabric design is used for clothing as well as for making personal items such as head scarves and makeup bags.

See also 

 African wax prints
 Wrapper (clothing)
 Shweshwe
 Kitenge

References 

African art
African clothing
Dresses
Textile arts of Africa